Zadabad (also Romanized as Zādābād) is a village in Chah Dadkhoda Rural District, Chah Dadkhoda District, Qaleh Ganj County, Kerman Province, Iran. At the 2006 census, its population was 46, in 8 families.

References 

Populated places in Qaleh Ganj County